Republicans for Choice is an American political action committee (PAC) composed of members of the United States Republican Party who support abortion rights.

History

Republicans for Choice was founded in 1989 by conservative fundraiser and activist Ann Stone, first wife of Roger Stone,  at the suggestion of Lee Atwater, a former chairman of the RNC, to counter the Republican Party's perceived increasing focus on anti-abortion candidates and political platform, and Stone brought this agenda to the 1992 Republican National Convention.

As of 2020, three Republicans serving in Congress had been supported by Republicans for Choice, Senators Shelley Moore Capito of West Virginia, Susan Collins of Maine, and Lisa Murkowski of Alaska. However, Republicans for Choice spends very little on campaigns, relative to other PACs.

Supported Members of Congress

Senate
Serving as of 2020:
Susan Collins, Maine
Shelley Moore Capito, West Virginia
Lisa Murkowski, Alaska

House
Serving as of 2020:
None

Mission

The organization has quoted the Republican Party's Statement of Principles, suggesting that this encompasses the option to choose abortion: the Party wants "[a]n America with a smaller less burdensome government that trusts its people to decide what is best for them ... [a]n America where freedom of expression, individual conscience, and personal privacy are cherished and respected."

It has called for the Human Life Amendment to be removed from the abortion plank and that the platform reflect real policy that represents a common ground approach where both sides of the GOP can work together to make abortion unnecessary without taking away women's rights.

RFC has successfully gotten language into the platform that encourages Republicans to follow their conscience on this and other divisive issues. They do not ask those who disagree with them to leave the GOP but rather to join with them to return to the real core Republican values that call for smaller government and protecting personal freedom.  They believe this should extend to both men and women. Ultimately they believe in a GOP that helps get the government out of the boardroom and the bedroom.

In that light, Republicans for Choice has suggested changes to the Republican National Platform with regard to societal attitudes towards gay and lesbian issues.

Republicans for Choice is partners with other Republican groups such as The Wish List, The Republican Majority For Choice, IMP-PAC (It's My Party Too), and the Republican Main Street Partnership.

See also
Democrats for Life of America
Libertarians for Life
Republican Majority for Choice

References

External links
Republicans for Choice PAC - Official website

Abortion-rights organizations in the United States
Choice
1989 establishments in the United States